Brad Wigney (born 30 June 1965) is an Australian cricketer. He played in 24 first-class and 27 List A matches for South Australia from 1992 to 2000.

See also
 List of South Australian representative cricketers

References

External links
 

1965 births
Living people
Australian cricketers
South Australia cricketers
Cricketers from Melbourne